Sunkist may refer to:
 Sunkist (soft drink), a brand of carbonated soft drink made under license from Sunkist Growers, Inc.
 Sunkist Growers, Incorporated, a citrus growers cooperative
 Sunkist Kids, an American wrestling club
 Sunkist the Perfect Dog, a character who briefly appears in the web series Half-Life VR but the AI is Self-Aware

zh:香吉士